Dancing on Ice is a Greek reality TV show. The show features celebrities paired with professionals from the world of figure skating. The show is based on the British show, Dancing on Ice. The show has a schedule similar to the reality TV show Dancing with the Stars with performance shows on Sundays nights. Jenny Balatsinou serves as host while Petros Kostopoulos, Elena Paparizou, and Alexis Kostalas serve on the judging panel. The show premiered on 6 November 2011.

Overview

Contestants
The contestants for the first season were:

Judges' scoring summary

Red numbers indicate the lowest score of the week
Green numbers indicate the highest score of the week
 indicates the couple that was in the skate off
 indicates the couple that was eliminated
 indicates the couple that won
 indicates that the couple came in second place
 indicates that the couple finished in third place
 indicates that a couple withdrew from the competition.

Average chart

Week 1

Individual judges scores in the chart below (given in parentheses) are listed in this order from left to right: Petros Kostopoulos, Elena Paparizou, Alexis Kostalas.

Running order

Week 2
Individual judges scores in the chart below (given in parentheses) are listed in this order from left to right: Petros Kostopoulos, Elena Paparizou, Alexis Kostalas.

Running order

Week 3

Individual judges scores in the chart below (given in parentheses) are listed in this order from left to right: Petros Kostopoulos, Elena Paparizou, Alexis Kostalas.

Running order

Week 4

Individual judges scores in the chart below (given in parentheses) are listed in this order from left to right: Petros Kostopoulos, Elena Paparizou, Alexis Kostalas.

Running order

Week 5

Individual judges scores in the chart below (given in parentheses) are listed in this order from left to right: Petros Kostopoulos, Elena Paparizou, Alexis Kostalas.

Running order

Week 6

Individual judges scores in the chart below (given in parentheses) are listed in this order from left to right: Petros Kostopoulos, Elena Paparizou, Alexis Kostalas.

Running order

Week 7

Individual judges scores in the chart below (given in parentheses) are listed in this order from left to right: Petros Kostopoulos, Elena Paparizou, Alexis Kostalas.

Running order

Week 8

Individual judges scores in the chart below (given in parentheses) are listed in this order from left to right: Petros Kostopoulos, Elena Paparizou, Alexis Kostalas.

Running order

Week 9

Individual judges scores in the chart below (given in parentheses) are listed in this order from left to right: Petros Kostopoulos, Elena Paparizou, Alexis Kostalas.

Running order

Week 10

Individual judges scores in the chart below (given in parentheses) are listed in this order from left to right: Petros Kostopoulos, Elena Paparizou, Alexis Kostalas.

Running order

Semi-final

Individual judges scores in the chart below (given in parentheses) are listed in this order from left to right: Petros Kostopoulos, Elena Paparizou, Alexis Kostalas.

Running order

Final

Individual judges scores in the chart below (given in parentheses) are listed in this order from left to right: Petros Kostopoulos, Elena Paparizou, Alexis Kostalas.

Running order

Element of the week

Reception
As a spin-off of the successful Dancing with the Stars franchise and the replacement for The X Factor as ANT1's leading reality show competition for the winter season, the program was anticipated. Although the premiere episode was broadcast over an hour and a half late due to the ongoing political debate between Prime Minister George Papandreou and opposition leader Antonis Samaras for a coalition government in the nation, it managed to attain 36.8 per cent of the overall ratings share and 40.9 percent in the 15–44 demographic. Despite this, the program has been critically panned. Critics generally found the show to be boring, the production low budget, and the concept irrelevant to the interests of Greek culture, where figure skating is obscure. Kosmas Vidos of To Vima wrote the show lacked entertainment value because although most of the celebrities gave decent performances, they were more concerned with not falling rather than dancing as had been advertised, "even though the thing that was most obvious was the effect of the economic crisis on television networks: extremely poor was the whole production, the lighting amateur, and the direction below average [with] a deep sense of boredom, dominating a competition where the goal was fun and joy." The show has in particular been compared negatively to its counterpart, Dancing with the Stars. Giannis Melas of NewsIt acknowledged the difficulty of the sport but ultimately felt that the low quality performances contributed to the overall "frigid" and "boring" ambience, while adding that several of the celebrities had not made strong enough attempts to learn what was required. He added that Dancing on Ice has a strong advantage in the ratings because its Sunday nine o'clock time slot faces virtually no competition. Nevertheless, he predicted that the next few episodes would be paramount to the show's success as "if it continues to be so ... boring probably the viewers will freeze it!"

Apart from being delayed, the premiere faced technical difficulties with the computers, which on multiple occasions attributed wrong scores to judges, while one of the professional skaters fell within the first moments of the show.

Host Jenny Balatsinou was described as "ultra sleek". Typically giving the lowest scores, Kostalas has been described as the tough judge. Melas commented that judges Alexis Kostalas and Petros Kostopoulos did not entice audiences with their characters, with the former speaking exclusively objectively and the latter "with his signature glibness for one more time in a judging panel without differentiating in anything from the last times." Alternately, he commended Elena Paparizou's television debut as a highlight on the show because "she demonstrated that she has reason and can stand worthily in her place. Comfortable, with humour, she gave appropriate critique to the contestants and even made fun of her own mistakes in Greek." Paparizou, who was born and raised in Sweden, expressed concern about her Greek on the show. Because of her malapropisms on the premiere, host Balatsinou dubbed her television's new George Levendis, the Greek-Australian X Factor judge, known for his own collection of poorly-phrased quotes.

References

2010s Greek television series
2011 Greek television series debuts
2012 Greek television series endings
ANT1 original programming
Greece
Figure skating in Greece
Greek reality television series
Television series by ITV Studios
Greek television series based on British television series